Stormy Lake, also known as Patterson Lake, is located in the Almaguin Highlands on the northeast boundary of Restoule Provincial Park in Patterson Township, Parry Sound District, Ontario, Canada.

The lake is connected to Clear Lake, being only separated by an island, making Stormy Lake and Clear Lake essentially the same body of water.

See also
List of lakes in Ontario

References

Lakes of Parry Sound District